Rettich is a surname of German origin, meaning "radish". People with that name include:

  (1920-1984), Dutch clown
 Karl Rettich (1841-1904), German landscape artist and draftsman
  (1839-1918), German politician
  (1939-2006), Dutch painter
 Scott Rettich (born 1984), American racing driver

See also
 

Surnames of German origin